The marital status of Ganesha varies widely in mythological stories and the issue has been the subject of considerable scholarly review. Several patterns of associations with different consorts are identifiable. One pattern of myths identifies Ganesha as an unmarried brahmacārin with no consorts. Another mainstream pattern associates him with the concepts of Buddhi (intellect), Siddhi (spiritual power), and Riddhi (prosperity); these qualities are sometimes personified as goddesses who are considered to be Ganesha's wives.  Another pattern connects Ganesha with the goddess of culture and the arts, Sarasvati. In the Bengal region he is linked with the banana tree, Kala Bo (or Kola Bou). Usually Ganesha's consort is portrayed as his shakti, a personification of his creative energy.

Some of the differences between these patterns can be understood by looking at regional variations across India, the time periods in which the patterns are found, and the traditions in which the beliefs are held.  Some differences pertain to the preferred meditation form used by the devotee, with many different traditional forms ranging from Ganesha as a young boy to Ganesha as a Tantric deity.

Unmarried

According to one non-mainstream tradition, Ganesha was a brahmacārin, that is, unmarried. This pattern is primarily popular in parts of southern India. This tradition was linked to the controversial concept of the relationship between celibacy and the commitment to spiritual growth. Bhaskaraya alludes to the tradition in which Ganesha was considered to be a lifelong bachelor in his commentary on the Ganesha Purana version of the Ganesha Sahasranama, which includes the name Abhīru (verse 9a). In his commentary on this verse Bhaskaraya says the name Abhīru means "without a woman," but the term can also mean "not fearful."

Buddhi, Siddhi, and Riddhi

The Ganesha Purana and the Mudgala Purana contain descriptions of Ganesha flanked by Siddhi and Buddhi. In these two Puranas they appear as an intrinsic part of Ganapati and according to Thapan do not require any special rituals associated with shakti worship. In Chapter I.18.24–39 of the Ganesha Purana,  performs worship in honor of Ganesha, and during it Ganesha himself causes Buddhi and Siddhi to appear so that  can offer them back to Ganesha. Ganesha accepts them as offerings.

The Ganesha Temple at Morgaon is the central shrine for the regional  complex.  The most sacred area within the Moragaon temple is the sanctum, a small enclosure containing an image of Ganesha.  To the right and left sides of the image stand Siddhi and Buddhi. In northern India the two female figures are said to be Siddhi and Riddhi. There is no  evidence for the pair, but the pairing parallels those of Buddhi and Siddhi in Shiva Purana and Riddhi and Buddhi from Matsya Purana.

Interpretation of relationships
The  has a story in which Ganesha and his brother Skanda compete for the right to marry the two desirable daughters of Prajāpati, Siddhi and Buddhi, and Ganesha wins through a clever approach. In discussing the Shiva Purana version, Courtright comments that while Ganesha is sometimes depicted as sitting between these two feminine deities, "these women are more like feminine emanations of his androgynous nature, Shaktis rather than spouses having their own characters and spouses."

Such may well have been the original conception, of which the marriage was a later development." In verse 49a of the Ganesha Purana version of the Ganesha Sahasranama, one of Ganesha's names is Ŗddhisiddhipravardhana ("Enhancer of material and spiritual success"). The Matsya Purana identifies  as the "Owner of the Qualities of Riddhi (prosperity) and Buddhi (wisdom)".

In the Ajitāgama, a Tantric form of Ganesha called Haridra Ganapati is described as turmeric-colored and flanked by two unnamed wives.  The word "wives" is specifically used. These wives are distinct from shaktis.

Ashta Siddhi

Ganesha's relationship with the Ashtasiddhi — the eight spiritual attaintments obtained by the practice of yoga — is also of this depersonalized type. In later iconography, these eight marvellous powers are represented by a group of young women who surround Ganesha. Raja Ravi Varma's painting (shown in this section) illustrates a recent example of this iconographic form. The painting includes fans, which establish the feminine figures as attendants. In Ganesha Purana, these personified  are used by Ganesha to attack demon Devantaka. These eight consorts are fused in a single devi, Ganesha's śakti, according to Getty.

Devi Santoshi
Ganesha was depicted as a householder married to Riddhi and Siddhi and the father of Santoshi Ma (Devanagari: संतोषी माँ), the goddess of contentment, in the 1975 Hindi film Jai Santoshi Maa. The movie script is not based on scriptural sources. The fact that a cult has developed around the figure of Santoshi Ma has been cited by Anita Raina Thapan and Lawrence Cohen as evidence of Ganesha's continuing evolution as a popular deity.

Buddhi (Wisdom)
Ganesha is considered to be the Lord of Intelligence.  In Sanskrit the word buddhi is a feminine noun that is variously translated as intelligence, wisdom, or intellect.  The concept of buddhi is closely associated with the personality of Ganesha as of the Puranic period, where many stories develop that showcase his cleverness and love of intelligence.  One of Ganesha's names in the Ganesha Purana and in the Ganesha Sahasranama is Buddhipriya. The name Buddhipriya also appears in a special list of twenty-one names that  says are of special importance at the end of the Ganesha Sahasranama.  The word priya can mean "fond of" or in a marital context it can mean "a lover, husband", so Buddhipriya means "fond of intelligence" or "Buddhi's husband".

This association with wisdom also appears in the name Buddha, which appears as a name of Ganesha in the second verse of the Ganesha Purana version of the Ganesha Sahasranama. The positioning of this name at the beginning of the Ganesha Sahasranama indicates that the name was of importance.  Bhaskararaya's commentary on the Ganesha Sahasranama says that this name for Ganesha means that the Buddha was an avatar of Ganesha.  This interpretation is not widely known even among Ganapatya, and the Buddha is not mentioned in the lists of Ganesha's incarnations given in the main sections of the Ganesha Purana and Mudgala Purana.  Bhaskararaya also provides a more general interpretation of this name as simply meaning that Ganesha's very form is "eternal enlightenment" , so he is named Buddha.

Motif of shaktis

A distinct type of iconographic image of Ganesha shows him with a single human-looking shakti. According to Ananda Coomaraswamy, the oldest known depiction of Ganesha with a shakti dates from the sixth century. The consort lacks a distinctive personality or iconographic repertoire.  According to Cohen and Getty, the appearance of this shakti motif parallels the emergence of tantric branches of the Ganapatya cult.  Getty mentions a specific cult of "Shakti Ganapati" that was set up by the Ganapatyas involving five distinct forms.  Of the thirty-two standard meditation forms for Ganesha that appear in the Sritattvanidhi, six include a shakti. A common form of this motif shows Ganesha seated with the shakti upon his left hip, holding a bowl of flat cakes or round sweets.  Ganesha turns his trunk to his own left in order to touch the tasty food.  In some of the tantric forms of this image, the gesture is modified to take on erotic overtones. Some tantric variants of this form are described in the  Tantram.

Prithvi Kumar Agrawala has traced at least six different lists of fifty or more aspects or forms of Ganesha each with their specific female consorts or shaktis. The names Buddhi, Siddhi, and Riddhi do not appear on any of these lists. The lists provide no details about the personalities or distinguishing iconographic forms for these shaktis. Agrawala concludes that all of the lists were derived from one original set of names. These lists are of two types. In the first type the names of various forms of Ganesha are given with a clear-cut pairing of a named shakti for that form. The second type of list poses problems in separating and properly connecting the names into pairs due to ambiguities in the formation of Sanskrit compound words.

Association with Sarasvati and Lakshmi 

Throughout India, on contemporary poster art, Ganesha is portrayed with Sarasvati (goddess of culture and art) or Lakshmi (goddess of luck and prosperity) or both. Ganesha, Lakshmi and Sarswati are often grouped together as the divinities immediately responsible for material welfare. Ganesha and Saraswati share control over Buddhi (Wisdom), while Ganesha and Lakshmi are both deities of Ṝddhi and Siddhi (material and spiritual success). Some identify the two goddesses as the same person and thus venerated individually with Ganesha, while others consider them distinct, and one or both of them as associated with Ganesha. Lakshmi's association with Ganesha is rarely tied with the Tantric tradition of Lakshmi as Ganesha's śakti. Other reasons are variously offered for their relationship: their functional equivance and their joint worship on Diwali and in general by the "business community." Conversely, in Calcutta, Ganesha is said to be the brother of Sarasvati and Lakshmi.

Kola Bou

In Bengal, Ganesha on Durga Puja is associated with a plantain (banana) tree, the "Kola Bou" (also spelled Kola-Bou), ritually transformed into a goddess during the festival.

On the first day of Durga Puja the Kola Bou is draped with a red-bordered white sari and vermilion is smeared on its leaves. She is then placed on a decorated pedestal and worshipped with flowers, sandalwood paste, and incense sticks. The Kola Bou is set on Ganesha's right side, along with other deities.  For most who view her, the new sari indicates her role as a new bride, and many Bengalis see it as symbolizing the wife of Ganesha.

A different view is that the Kola Bou represents Durga herself, who in Bengal is considered the mother of Ganesha.  Those who know of that tradition do not consider Ganesha's association with Kola Bou as a marital one.  Haridas Mitra says that the Kola Bou is intended to serve as a symbolic summary for the nine types of leaves (nava patrika) that together form a sacred complex on Durga Puja.  The officiating priests who carry out the ceremony tie a bunch of eight plants on the trunk of the plantain tree and it is the grouping of all nine plants that constitute the Kola Bou.  The nine plants all have beneficial medicinal properties. According to Martin-Dubost, the Kola Bou does not represent a bride or shakti of Ganesha, but rather is the plant form of Durga. He connects the plant symbol back to the festival enactment of Durga's return of the blood of the buffalo demon to the earth so that the order of the world may be re-established and luxuriant vegetation reappear.  He links Ganesha to this vegetation myth and notes that Astadasausadhisristi ("Creator of the eighteen medicinal plants") is a name of Ganesha.

Notes

References

 (fourth revised & enlarged edition).
 (1993 reprint edition).

Ganesha
Hindu goddesses